The Class is a 2008 French drama film directed by Laurent Cantet, based on the 2006 novel of the same name by François Bégaudeau. The novel is a semi-autobiographical account of Bégaudeau's experiences as a French language and literature teacher in a middle school in the 20th arrondissement of Paris, particularly illuminating his struggles with "problem children": Esmerelda (Esmeralda Ouertani), Khoumba (Rachel Regulier), and Souleymane (Franck Keïta). The film stars Bégaudeau himself in the role of the teacher.

The film received a unanimous Palme d'Or at the 2008 Cannes Film Festival, making it the first French film to do so since 1987, when Maurice Pialat won the award for  Under the Sun of Satan. The Class was also nominated for an Academy Award for Best Foreign Language Film, but lost to Departures.

Plot
Set wholly in a secondary school in a working-class district of Paris, where many inhabitants are foreign-born, the film follows the year of a young teacher, François Marin, and the 25 pupils aged 14 or 15 who he takes for an hour each day in French language. A loner, he walks the narrow line between maintaining discipline and gaining co-operation.

From the start, wide differences are apparent in the class over standards of dress, deportment, knowledge, and application. A dispute arises over using the imperfect and pluperfect subjunctive, which he admits may be a bit of an affectation and a student questions whether François is gay. When pupils have to read aloud from The Diary of Anne Frank, a girl called Khoumba refuses because she does not consider it relevant to her life. In private, François forces her to apologize.

Success comes when he asks the pupils to write a self-portrait. An assertive girl called Esmeralda reveals that she would like to be a policewoman or failing that, a rapper. A difficult boy called Souleymane, weak in written French, submits his story in an interesting series of photographs (at a parents' evening, his mother cannot understand or speak French). However, after an argument over football teams with Carl, another boy who is problematic, Souleymane insults François and is sent to the head teacher's office.

At a teachers' conference to decide final placings, François defends Souleymane but his efforts are undermined by the two student representatives at the meeting, Esmeralda and Louise, who behave in a very childish manner. During the next class, despite the confidential nature of the teachers' conference, the two girls tell the others that François had it in for Souleymane. A furious François rebukes the pair, saying they behaved like "skanks". Uproar follows, in which Souleymane, after accidentally hitting Khoumba with his backpack, storms out and is suspended. Later, Khoumba pulls aside François, telling him that if Souleymane is expelled, his father may send him back to his native country, Mali, as punishment. After a disciplinary hearing at which Souleymane is supported by his mother, for whom he has to translate, he is ultimately expelled.

In the last lesson of the year, François asks each pupil what they have learned over the year. Carl has been inspired by science experiments in his chemistry class, Khoumba has warmed to music and enjoyed learning Spanish, Esmerelda professes to have learned nothing in school but then admits that she has read Plato's Republic in her free time. After they have all left the room, a quiet girl called Henriette comes back and despondently claims that she really has not learned anything at all. Outside, an impromptu football match has begun between the pupils and teachers.

Cast

Reception

The film was the featured opening night selection at the 46th New York Film Festival in 2008.

The film has received critical acclaim, achieving a 95% rating at Rotten Tomatoes out of 161 reviews counted, and an average rating of 8.06/10. The site's consensus reads, "Energetic and bright, this hybrid of documentary style and dramatic plotting looks at the present and future of France through the interactions of a teacher and his students in an inner-city high school." Metacritic lists Entre les murs with a rating of 92, based on 31 critics, making it one of the best reviewed films of the year according to the website.

The film was warmly reviewed by the critic Philip French who noted: "There is a remarkable French tradition of school films, extending from Jean Vigo's Zéro de Conduite, to Nicolas Philibert's Être et avoir. Laurent Cantet, whose parents were both teachers, carries it on and he elicits marvellous performances... As the teacher at a tough, racially mixed, inner-city school in Paris, Marin (François Bégaudeau), neither weary cynic nor wide-eyed idealist, is a decent, determined realist... not a saint, though by the end of the school year he has exhibited some of the necessary qualities."

The film appeared on many critics' top ten lists of the best films of 2008.

French researcher and education writer Philippe Meirieu observed that the film shows a teacher full of leftist good intentions, who nevertheless neglects any mediation and does not use any pedagogy other than a kind of dialogical lecture without any constructed learning situation. The teacher comes to rely on seduction, pressure and sanction without avoiding personal confrontation with some of his pupils. Meirieu is concerned about the reading that can be made of the film, which, by showing the difficulties and the explosive situation that emerges, suggests that there is no alternative or which would reinforces authoritarianism and anti-pedagogism.

Accolades

References

External links

 
 
 

2008 films
Films about educators
Films directed by Laurent Cantet
Sony Pictures Classics films
2000s French-language films
Palme d'Or winners
Independent Spirit Award for Best Foreign Film winners
Best Film Lumières Award winners
2000s teen drama films
Films set in schools
French teen drama films
2008 drama films
Films based on French novels
2000s French films